St Mary's Church is an active parish church in the village of Great Baddow, Essex, England. The church stands on the High Street in the centre of the village and dates from the 12th century. Much extended in the 16th century, and heavily restored in the 19th and 20th centuries, the church is a Grade I listed building.

History
The urban village of Great Baddow stands within the boundaries of the City of Chelmsford. In his Essex Directory of 1848, William White described it as "one of the handsomest villages in Essex". The Church of St Mary dates from the 12th century. In the 14th century, the churchyard at St Mary's was the gathering place of a contingent of men from Essex, who then marched south to London to join Wat Tyler in the Peasants' Revolt. The building was enhanced and extended in the 16th century, with brickwork of high quality. A major restoration in the 19th century, was followed in the 20th by further renovations and reordering of the interior.

St Mary's contains a notable monument to the Gwyn sisters and their friend Ann Antrim by Henry Cheere. Another monument honours Major-general Sir Nicholas Trant, who served under the Duke of Wellington in the Peninsular War. A soldier of considerable daring, Wellington described him as, "a very good officer, but as drunk a dog as ever lived." St Mary's has memorial plaques to the men of Great Baddow who died in the First and the Second World Wars. In September 2022 the church was the starting point for a commemorative walk, ending at Chelmsford Cathedral, for families, mainly from Essex, who had lost children to violent crime.

The church remains an active parish church in the Diocese of Chelmsford.

Architecture
Historic England gives a foundation date for the church as the 12th century. The chancel dates from the 13th century and the tower from the 14th. Major expansion of the building occurred in the early 16th century. Nicholas Bettley, in the Essex volume of the Pevsner Buildings of England series, considered the church exterior "splendid", due largely to its Tudor brickwork dating from this time. The remainder of the construction material is flint rubble.

A Victorian renovation was undertaken by C. and W. H. Pertwee between 1892 and 1903. Further modifications were made in the 20th century. Internally, the pulpit is early 16th century. Nikolaus Pevsner thought it, "the best of its date in the county". The church is a Grade I listed building.

The churchyard contains the Duffield Memorial. Designed by Herbert Maryon in 1912, it commemorates a prominent local solicitor, William Ward Duffield, his wife, Marianne and their son. The lychgate to the churchyard is by Ninian Comper and dates from 1930.

Gallery

See also

 Essex Churches - St Mary's Great Baddow

Notes

References

Sources
 
 
 
 
 

Grade I listed churches in Essex
English Gothic architecture in Essex
Buildings and structures in Chelmsford (city)